is a Japanese voice actor and member of Aoni Production. Suganuma wanted to be a voice actor when he watched Mobile Suit Victory Gundam. He was also part of the voice actor unit G.I.Zoku with Kisho Taniyama and Hideki Tasaka.

Filmography

Television animation
Angel Tales as Gorou Mutsumi
Beyblade G-Revolution as Eddie; Reporter C (ep 2)
Beyblade V-Force as Gordo
Beyblade as Eddy
Bleach as Wonderweiss Margela
Blue Gender as Joey Heald
Bobobo-bo Bo-bobo as Pilot (ep. 2) and Beep
DearS as No.2
Gintama as Kantarou Hashida
Haikyū!! as Noboru Akimiya
Inuyasha as Tsuyu's husband
Kikaider as Kuya / Kaito
Kuroshitsuji as Fred Abberline
La Corda d'Oro as Junnosuke Sasaki
Magical Canan as Natsuki
Marvel Disk Wars: The Avengers as Sam Alexander/Nova
Midori Days as Arashi
Monster as Detective Jan Suk (ep 43+)
Naruto as Mizuki Touji (Young)
Natsume's Book of Friends as Atsushi Kitamoto
One Piece as Daruma; Lindbergh
SD Gundam Sangokuden Brave Battle Warriors as Kakuka Virsago
Shadow Star Narutaru as Bungo Takano
Sugar: A Little Snow Fairy as Wind Fairy (ep 16)
Tactical Roar as Hyousuke Nagimiya
Tenchi Muyo! GXP as Alien Comedians (ep 5); Kai Masaki; Operator A (ep 10); Ryoko's Crew A (ep 3); Ryoko's Operator (ep 11)
Tegami Bachi as Connor Kluff
Wind: A Breath of Heart as Makoto Okano
World Trigger (2014) as Shirō Kikuchihara
Yu-Gi-Oh! Duel Monsters GX as Prince Ojin

Original video animation (OVA)
Wind: A Breath of Heart as Makoto Okano

Film
Mobile Suit Gundam - The Movie Trilogy as Boy A (Special Edition)
Clockwork Island Adventure as Donny
Natsume's Book of Friends Movie as Atsushi Kitamoto

Drama CDs
Executive Boy (Kouki Shinomiya)
Subete wa Kono Yoru ni (Shiro Satomura)
Tsuki to Sabaku no Neru Yoru (Naoya Setou)
Wagamama Daiou ni Ki wo Tsukero (Umi Oosuga)

Video games
Airforce Delta Strike as Brian Douglas
Dynasty Warriors as Jiang Wei, Sun Quan
Inuyasha as Tsuyu's husband
Otometeki Koi Kakumei Love Revo!! as Souta Fukami
Puyo Puyo! 15th Anniversary as Suketoudara
Puyo Puyo 7 as Suketoudara
Rune Factory Frontier as Marco
Sakura Wars: So Long, My Love as Shinjiro Taiga
Tales of the World: Narikiri Dungeon 2 as Frio Sven
Yggdra Union as Cruz and Canaan
Rockman ZX Advent as Tethys

References

External links
 菅沼久義オフィシャルサイト (Hisayoshi Suganuma Official Site)

1978 births
Japanese male voice actors
Living people
Male voice actors from Tokyo
Aoni Production voice actors